Zero Tolerance for Silence is a studio album by American jazz guitarist Pat Metheny that was released by Geffen Records label in 1994. The album was recorded in one day and consists of improvised, solo electric guitar.

Background and reception
Tim Griggs of AllMusic called it "semi-organized noise."

Griggs has two theories about the album's origins. The first is that Metheny was upset with Geffen, and as his contract was ending, this was his way of expressing his displeasure. In 2008, Metheny said,That rumor was started by a journalist who was seriously not listening to the album. All it would have taken was a quick phone call [to me] to find out that that wasn't the case. Besides, I would never do something like that. It isn't the way I operate, which I think has been pretty self-evident over the years. That record speaks for itself in its own musical terms. To me, it is a 2-D view of a world in which I am usually functioning in a more 3-D way. It is entirely flat music, and that was exactly what it was intended to be.

Griggs's second theory is that Metheny simply made the kind of album he wanted to make. At All About Jazz, one critic called it "the album no one seems to understand."

The cover of Zero Tolerance for Silence carried an endorsement by Thurston Moore, guitarist for Sonic Youth, who called the album "an incendiary work by an unpredictable master." Critics have been less kind. Ben Watson of the music magazine The Wire called it "rubbish," and Griggs gave it 1.5 out of a possible 5 stars.

Track listing

Personnel
 Pat Metheny – electric guitar

References

 Ben Watson, Derek Bailey and the Story of Free Improvisation, Verso, 2004 

Pat Metheny albums
1994 albums
Geffen Records albums